Jason Sidney Love (born September 15, 1987) is an American professional basketball player for Unión de Santa Fe of the TNA. He played college basketball at the Xavier University.

Professional career
Love went undrafted in the 2010 NBA draft. In July 2011, he signed with VOO Wolves Verviers-Pepinster of Belgium for the 2011–12 season.

In June 2012, he signed with Antwerp Giants for the 2012–13 season.

In June 2013, he signed with Belfius Mons-Hainaut for the 2013–14 season. In December 2013, he was named Eurocup MVP for Round 9. In July 2014, he re-signed with Belfius Mons-Hainaut for one more season.

On August 15, 2015, Love signed with Maccabi Kiryat Gat of the Israeli Premier League. On December 22, 2015, he left Kiryat Gat and returned to Belgium where he signed with Limburg United for the rest of the season.

On September 27, 2016, Love signed with TED Ankara Kolejliler for the 2016–17 season. In November 2016, he left TED Ankara after appearing in six games. In early December 2016, he signed with Ukrainian club Khimik for the rest of the season. On October 23, 2017, he re-signed with Khimik. On December 12, 2017, he left Khimik and signed a one-month deal with Belfius Mons-Hainaut. On March 10, 2018, Love signed with Unión de Santa Fe.

References

External links
RealGM.com profile
Xavier Musketeers Bio

1987 births
Living people
African-American basketball players
American expatriate basketball people in Belgium
American expatriate basketball people in Israel
American expatriate basketball people in Turkey
American expatriate basketball people in Ukraine
American men's basketball players
Antwerp Giants players
Basketball players from Philadelphia
BC Khimik players
Belfius Mons-Hainaut players
Centers (basketball)
Limburg United players
Maccabi Kiryat Gat B.C. players
RBC Pepinster players
Power forwards (basketball)
TED Ankara Kolejliler players
Xavier Musketeers men's basketball players
21st-century African-American sportspeople
20th-century African-American people